The Frafra are a subset of the Gurunsi peoples living in Northern Ghana. The preferred name for the group is Fare-Fare. The adopted name Frafra is a corruption from colonial times of the greeting "Ya fara-fara?" which means "How is your suffering [work]?" It may carry pejorative overtones in local usage. Frafra-language speakers number approximately 300,000. The larger group of Gurunsi people inhabit southern Burkina Faso and Northern Ghana.

Geography 
Bolgatanga is the commercial center of the Frafra area. Other important villages and towns include Bongo, Zuarungu, Zoko, and Pwalugu. Tongo is the principal town of the Talensi people, who are ethnically distinct from the Frafra, but most of whom are bilingual in the Frafra language.

History
The Frafra share a common history, language and political structure. Most Gurunsi live in Burkina Faso, and the degree to which Frafra history differs from their northerly neighbors, such as the Nuna, Bwa and Winiama, is linked to their abode in Ghana. These differences arose during colonial times, as French and British colonial systems differed.

Society

Economy
Frafra are primarily farmers, growing millet, sorghum and yams. Maize, rice, peanuts, and beans are grown in addition. Farmers throughout the region traditionally practiced slash-and-burn farming, using fields for approximately seven or eight years before they were allowed to lie fallow for at least a decade. In family fields close to villages, women grow cash crops for sale in local markets, including sesame and tobacco.

Men participate in hunting during the long dry season. This is important for ritual reasons since it is during this time that men interact with the spirits that inhabit the bush. During the dry season, when food supplies are running low, some fishing is practiced in local swamps.

Increasing population pressure has led to a shortening of fallow-times and a much smaller interval for hunting. Little bushland is available for slash-and-burn methods and the clearing of new farms.

Political system
Frafra societies are mainly without social or political stratification. They are not divided among occupational castes or groups since most of them hunt and farm. They had no system of chiefs, and all important decisions were made by a council of elders consisting of the oldest members of each lineage.

Religious leaders hold some political authority, determining the agricultural cycle and parceling out land for cultivation.

Culture

Religion
The belief in a supreme creator is central to Frafra beliefs. A shrine to this god occupies the center of every village. Each extended family maintains its own house, in which magical lineage objects are kept. The objects allow the family to maintain contact with the vital forces of nature. These objects are inherited by descendants and are the communal property of the lineage. They provide protection and social cohesion among all members of the family.

Art and literature 
The most recognized of the Frafra art forms are cast brass jewelry and decorated architecture. In addition, anthropomorphic figures sculpted from clay and wood and various personal objects, ranging from jewelry to wooden stools, are created to honor the spirits.

A body of Frafra literature is emerging. A. Pamzoya first wrote a novel on Frafra culture called Souvenir for Death. Intellectual Agaysika Agambila gathered a collection of Frafra folktales under the title Solma: Tales from Northern Ghana. This was followed by Journey, a novel set in the Frafra area.

Frafra peoples have a special, joking relationship with the Dagaare people of northwestern Ghana, which has its roots in an asserted common ancestry.

References

Ethnic groups in Ghana